Duin is a Dutch surname. It comes from the Middle Dutch dūne and was originally given to someone who lived near a sand dune. Notable people with this surname include:
André van Duin (born 1947), Dutch actor in comedy and theatre
Garrelt Duin (born 1968), German politician
Julia Duin, American journalist and author

References

See also
Van Duijn

Dutch-language surnames